Eriostemon australasius commonly known as pink wax flower is a plant in the citrus family Rutaceae and is endemic to eastern Australia. It is an erect, bushy shrub with narrow oblong leaves and pink flowers with five petals in late winter and early spring.

Description
At the base of each flower are five to twelve sepal-like bracteoles. Flowering occurs in late winter and early spring.

Taxonomy and naming
Eriostemon australasius was first formally described in 1805 by Christiaan Persoon and the description was published in Synopsis plantarum, seu enchiridium botanicum, complectens enumerationem systematicam specierum. The specific epithet (australasius) is derived from the Latin word australis meaning "south". The common name is derived from the thick waxy petals.

Distribution and habitat
Pink wax flower grows in heathland and dry eucalyptus woodlands from Lake Conjola on the New South Wales south coast northwards along the coast to Fraser Island in Queensland.

Use in horticulture
Eriostemon australasius was first cultivated in England in 1824. It adapts fairly readily to the garden situation, as long as it has good drainage, in dappled shade to full sun. The roots benefit from some shelter. It can be propagated from cuttings or from seed with difficulty and is moderately frost tolerant.

References 

Flora of New South Wales
Flora of Queensland
Plants described in 1805
Zanthoxyloideae